Imran Series is the best-selling series of Urdu spy novels written starting from 1955 until his death in 1980 by Ibn-e-Safi.

Both Doctor Dua-go and Jonk Ki Wapsi were published as a series of episodes in the Daily Hurriyat, and later published in the form of books by "Asrar Publications" (the regular publishers of Imran Series). Zehrili Tasveer and Bebakon Ki Talash were then written in the continuity of Jonk ki Wapsi and were published by the above in book form. For this reason, these books are numbered at the end, otherwise they should not be considered "out of continuity".

Ali Imran and Safdar Saeed were also featured in a Jasoosi Dunya novel, Zameen Ke Badal (#75). This was the only novel in which Safi brought Colonel Faridi and Imran together, but due to a highly heated response from fans, he never repeated the experiment.

Following is the complete list of 120 novels written by Ibn-e-Safi in Imran  series. (Original number, original title (Roman), original title (Urdu), translated tile in parentheses, year first published.)

 Khaufnak Imarat (The House Of Fear) - 1955
 Chatanon Maen Fa'ir (Gunfire in the Rocks) - 1955
 Pur-Asrar Cheekhain (Mysterious Screams) - 1955
 Bhayanak Aadmi (The Dreadful Man) - 1956
 Jahanam Ki Raqasa (Dancer from Hell) - 1956
 Neelay Parinday (The Blue Birds) - 1956
 Saanpoan Ke Shikari (Snake Hunters) - 1956
 Raat Ka Shehzada (The Nocturnal Prince) - 1956
 Dhuain Ki Tehreer (Scribbling in Smoke) - 1956
 Larkiyoan Ka Jazeerah (Women Island) - 1956
 Patthar Ka Khoon (Blood of Rocks) - 1956
 Lashoan Ka Bazaar (Corpse Carnival) - 1956
 Qabr Aur Khanjar (The Grave and The Dagger) - 1956
 Ahani Darwaza (The Iron Door) - 1956
 Kaalay Charaagh (The Dark Lamps) - 1956
 Khoon Ke Piyasay (Bloodthirsty) - 1957
 Alphansay (Alphonse) - 1957
 Darindoan Ki Basti (Colony of Beasts) - 1957
 Gum-shuda Shahzadi (The Lost Princess) - 1957
 Hamaqat Ka Jaal (Trap of Folly) - 1957
 Shafaq Ke Pujari (Twilight Worshipers) - 1957
 Qasid Ki Talaash (Hunt for the Courier) - 1957
 Ra'i Ka Parbut (Mountain of Molehill) - 1957
 Pagal Kuttay (Mad Dogs) - 1957
 Piyasa Samandar (Thirsty Ocean) - 1957
 Kali Tasweer (The Dark Photograph) - 1957
 Sawaliya Nishan (Question Mark) - 1958
 Khatarnak Lashaen (Dangerous Corpses) - 1958
 Gaind Ki Tabahkari (Destruction by the Ball) - 1958
 Char Lakeerain (Four Stripes) - 1958
 Challees-Aik-Bavan (Forty One Fifty Two) - 1958
 Atishdan Ka Buut (Statue at the Fireplace) - 1958
 Jaroan Ki Talash (Quest for the Roots) - 1958
 Imran Ka Aghwa (Imran's Abduction) - 1958
 Jazeroan Ki Rooh (Spirit of the Islands) - 1959
 Cheekhti Roohain (Screaming Spirits) - 1959
 Khatarnak Juwari (Dangerous Gambler) - 1959
 Zulmaat Ka Devta (Lord of Darkness) - 1959
 Heeroan Ka Faraeb (Diamond Fraud) - 1959
 Dilchasp Hadisa (Exciting Accident) - 1960
 Bay-Aawaz Sayyarah (Silent Satellite) - 1960
 Daerh Matwalay (One-and-a-Half Buddies) - 1963
 Billi Cheekhti Hai (Cat Cries) - 1964
 Daktar Dua-goe (Doctor Beadsman) - 1964
 Joank Ki Wapsi (Return of the Leech) - 1964
 Zehrili Tasweer (Poisonous Painting) - 1964
 Lo-Bo Li-La (Lo-Bo Li-La) - 1965
 Bebakon Ki Talash (Quest for the Fearless) - 1965
 Seh Ranga Shola (Tri-coloured Flame) - 1966
 Aatishi Badal (Cloud of Fire) - 1966
 Geet Aur Khoon (Song and Blood) - 1966
 Doosri Aankh (Second Eye) - 1966
 Aankh Shoala Bani (Eye in Inferno) - 1967
 Shugar Baenk (Sugar Bank) - 1967
 Taboot Main Cheekh (Cry in the Casket) - 1968
 Fazai Hangama (Aerial  Assault) - 1968
 Tasweer Ki Uraan (Flight of the Painting) - 1968
 Giyaarah November (November 11th) - 1969
 Minaroan Waliyaan (Ladies with Turrets) - 1969
 Sabz Lahu (Green Blood) - 196
 Behri Yateem Khana (The Marine Orphanage) - 1970
 Pagaloan Kee Anjuman (Association of Lunatics) - 1970
 Halaku Aend Ko (Halaku & Co.) - 1970
 Paharoan Ke Peechhay (Behind the Mountains) - 1971
 Buzdil Soorma (The Coward Knight) - 1971
 Dast-e-Qaza (Hand of Death) - 1972
 Ashtray Ha'uss (Ashtray House) - 1972
 Uqaboan Ke Hamlay (Attacks of the Eagles) - 1972
 Phir Wohi Aawaz (That Voice Again!) - 1972
 Khoonraez Tasadum (The Bloody Encounter) - 1972
 Tasweer Ki Maut (Death of the Painting) - 1973
 King Chaang (King Chang) - 1973
 Dhuaein Ka Hisaar (Smoke Bulwark) - 1973
 Samandar Ka Shigaaf (The Ocean's Crack) - 1973
 Zalzalay Ka Safar (Journey of the Earthquake) - 1974
 Blaek Aend Whait (Black and White) - 1974
 Na Deedah Hamdard (Unseen Well-wisher) - 1974 
 Adhoora Aadmi (The Partial Man) - 1974 
 Aapraeshan Dabal Kraas (Operation Double-cross) - 1974
 Khair Andaesh (Well-wisher) - 1974
 Point Number Barah (Point No. 12) - 1974
 Aidlaawa (Ed Lava) - 1974
 Baemboo Kaesil (Bamboo Castle) - 1974
 Maasoom Darinda (Innocent Beast) - 1974
 Baegum X-2 (Mrs. X-2) - 1975
 Shahbaz Ka Basera (Abode of the Hawk) - 1975
 Raeshoan Ki Yalghar (Fibres Assault) - 1975
 Khatarnak Dhalaan (Perilous Slope) - 1975
 Jangal Main Mangal (Feast in the Forest) - 1975
 Teen Sanki (Three Lunatics) - 1975
 Aadha Teetar (Half Partridge) - 1975
 Aadha Batair (Half Quail) - 1975
 Allama Dehshatnak (Fearsome Scholar) - 1976
 Farishtay Ka Dushman (Foe of the Angel) - 1976
 Be-charah Shahzor (The Poor Antagonist) - 1976
 Kali Kehkashan (Dark Galaxy) - 1976
 Seh Rangi Maut (Tri-colored Death) - 1976
 Mutaharik Dhariyan (Animated Stripes) - 1976
 Joank Aur Nagan (Leech and Serpent) - 1976
 Laash Gaati Rahii (The Singing Corpse) - 1976
 Khushboo Ka Hamla (Attack of Scent) - 1976
 Baba Sug-Parast (Old Dog-worshiper) - 1977
 Mehektay Muhafiz (Fragrant Guards) - 1977
 Halaakat Khaiz (The Deadly) - 1977
 Zebra Man (Zebra-Man) - 1977
 Jangal Ki Sheheriyat (Citizenship of Jungle) - 1977
 Mona Leeza Ki Nawasi (Mona Lisa's Granddaughter) - 1977
 Khooni Fankar (Bloody Artist) - 1977
 Maut Ki Aahat (Sound of Death) - 1978
 Doosra Rukh (The Other Side) - 1978
 Chatanoon Ka Raaz (Secret of the Rocks) - 1978
 Thanda Suraj (The Cold Sun) - 1978
 Talash-e Gumshudah (In Search of the Lost) - 1979
 Aag Ka Dairah (Ring of Fire) - 1979
 Larazti Lakeerain (Wavering Stripes) - 1979
 Patthar Ka Aadmi (The Stone Man) - 1979
 Doosra Patthar (The Second Stone) - 1979
 Khatarnak Ungliyaan (Dangerous Fingers) - 1979
 Raat Ka Bhikari (Nocturnal Beggar) - 1980
 Aakhri Admi (Last Man) - 1980

See also
 Ibn-e-Safi
 Imran Series
 Ali Imran
 Family of Ali Imran
 List of Jasoosi Dunya by Ibn-e-Safi

References

Ibn-e-Safi
Imran Series
Imran Series